The Neka–Jask pipeline is a proposed oil pipeline in Iran. If constructed, it will transport crude oil from Kazakhstan, Azerbaijan, Turkmenistan and Russia through the port of Neka on the Caspian Sea to Jask, Iran on the Gulf of Oman. It is expected to cost US$2 billion.

References

Oil pipelines in Iran
Proposed pipelines in Asia
Proposed buildings and structures in Iran